Metal Mind Productions (MMP) is a Polish record label founded in 1987. The label focuses on rock and heavy metal. MMP is also publisher of Metal Hammer, the largest and the oldest heavy metal magazine. As a concert agency, it organises Metalmania, the largest heavy metal event in Central–Eastern Europe, and it organised over 1000 concerts, including Monsters of Rock in Poland, 1991.

Metal Mind Productions over the years became the subject of criticism from such bands as Malevolent Creation, Enter Chaos, Behemoth and Moonlight among others, for releasing unauthorized records and lack of professionalism. They purchased rights for several albums from Empire Records that include titles from such bands as Totem, Sammath Naur, Dissenter, Deivos, Archeon, Spinal Cord, Demise, Naumachia, and Pyorrhoea. and re-released them in 2007 and 2008 although the musicians were not been informed about the deal and were unable to contact Metal Mind.

Metal Mind had a licensing deal with Music for Nations from the 1990s until its closure in 2004. That deal included releases by such bands as Candlemass, Thrasher, Dispatched and Paradise Lost among others. It also had a distribution and licensing deal with Century Media Records that included releases by such bands as Sentenced, Death, Cryptopsy, Arch Enemy, Strapping Young Lad, Jag Panzer, The Gathering, Bloodbath and Massacre among others.

In 2006 Metal Mind Productions  signed a multi-licensing deal with Roadrunner Records for their back catalogue. The selection of bands included Solitude Aeturnus, Willard, Trojan, Atrocity, Crimson Glory, Front Line Assembly, Violent Force, Acrophet, Amen, Atrophy, Heathen, Realm, Xentrix, Defiance, Disincarnate, Pestilence, Last Crack, Znowhite, Sadus, Toxik, Bulldozer and Gorguts.

In 2008 the label signed a similar deal with Nuclear Blast for their back catalogue. The selection of bands include Brutallity, Control Denied, Darkane, Disbelief, Dismal Euphony, Destruction, Theatre of Tragedy, Stormwitch, Darkseed, Disharmonic Orchestra, Gardenian, Primal Fear, Farmer Boys, Horde, Hypocrisy, Impulse Manslaughter, Macabre, Mortification, Night in Gales, Slaughter, Abomination, Warhammer and Winter.

On other various licenses Metal Mind Productions released albums by artists such as Ankh, Anvil, Art Rock, Astharoth, Bang Tango, Bank, Blaze Bayley, Believer, Warlock and Wilczy Pająk among others.

In 2010 label founder Tomasz Dziubiński died of neoplasm.

Bands

Current
 
2TM2,3
After...
Agressiva 69
Alastor
Andareda
Anti Tank Nun
Apostolis Anthimos
Believe
Budzy i Trupia Czaszka
Caamora
Ceti
Chemia
Clive Nolan
Cochise
Coria
Corruption
Doogie White & La Paz
Doogie White
Elvis Deluxe
Elżbieta Mielczarek
Exlibris
Grube Ryby
Hellectricity
Jan "Kyks" Skrzek 
Janusz Niekrasz Band
J. D. Overdrive 
Kasa Chorych
Kat 
Kruk 
Krzak 
Laboratorium
Leash Eye
Mech 
Minerals 
Mr Gil
Noko 
One Million Bulgarians 
Ordinary Brainwash
Opprobrium 
Osada Vida 
Pampeluna
Panzer X
Paul Di'Anno
Satellite
SBB
Speculum
Sui Generis Umbra
Śląska Grupa Bluesowa
Turbo 
TSA
WAMI (White Appice Mendoza Iggy) 
Will Wallner & Vivien Vain
Via Mistica

Former
 
Acid Drinkers
Aion (disbanded)
Akurat 
Ani DiFranco
Anal Stench (disbanded)
Anathema  
Arena
Armia
Artillery 
Artrosis 
Asgaard
Batalion d'Amour 
Behemoth (Poland only) 
Bright Ophidia
Carpathian Forest
Ciryam
Cemetery of Scream
Chainsaw
Closterkeller 
Cree 
Dance on Glass (disbanded)
Dark Tranquillity (Poland only)
Darzamat
Decapitated
Dezerter
Delight (disbanded)
Desdemona
Dies Irae (disbanded)
Dragon (disbanded)
Elysium (disbanded)
Enter Chaos (disbanded)
Enslaved
Final Conflict 
Frontside
Gordon Haskell
Gorgoroth
Grave
Grzegorz Kupczyk
Hate 
Hedfirst
Hetman
Hunter 
Homo Twist
Horrorscope
Izrael
Jadis
John Porter
Józef Skrzek
Killjoy 
Lizard
Luna Ad Noctum
Love De Vice 
Łzy 
Mess Age (disbanded)
Michael Schenker Group
Mietek Blues Band
Moonlight (disbanded)
Moonspell
Naamah (disbanded)
NeraNature
NewBreed 
Obituary
Onslought
Oddział Zamknięty
Overhead 
Pain
Pallas 
Patrycja Markowska
Pendragon
Perfect
Retribution
Rotting Christ
RPWL
Sacriversum (disbanded) 
Serpentia 
Shadowland 
Shakin' Dudi
Sirrah
StrommoussHeld 
Tenebrosus (disbanded)
The No-Mads
Thy Disease
Tinyfish
Tomasz Mars
Tuff Enuff 
Vader (Poland only)
Vital Remains   
WU-HAE
Złe Psy 
Ziyo

See also
 Metal Hammer
 Metalmania
 List of record labels

References

External links
Official website 
Metal Mind Records at Discogs
Article about Metal Mind's Reissue Series
Article about Metal Mind's Thrash Metal Reissue Series

Polish independent record labels
Record labels established in 1987
Heavy metal record labels
Rock record labels
Reissue record labels
Polish Limited Liability Companies